Aga (Sumerian:) commonly known as Aga of Kish, was the twenty-third and last king in the first dynasty of Kish during the Early Dynastic I period. He is listed in the Sumerian King List and many sources as the son of Enmebaragesi. The Kishite king ruled the city at its peak, probably reaching beyond the territory of Kish, including Umma and Zabala.

The Sumerian poem Gilgamesh and Aga records the Kishite siege of Uruk after its lord Gilgamesh refused to submit to Aga, ending in Aga's defeat and consequently the fall of Kish's hegemony.

Name

The name of Aga is Sumerian and a relatively rarely attested personal name in Early Dynastic times, making his identification in royal texts spottable. His name appears in the Stele of Ushumgal, as the gal-ukkin ("Great Assembly official").

AK was likely an Early Dynastic spelling of Akka, (the past particle of the Sumerian verb "to make"). The name in question is to be interpreted as a Sumerian genitival phrase, Akka probably means "Made by [a god]" (ak + Divine Name.ak).

Historical king
Aga is attested in two compositions of an historiographical nature, the Sumerian King List and the Tummal Inscription, both as the son of Enmebaragesi, who has been verified through archaeological inscriptions; these sources may confirm Aga and Gilgamesh's existence. Aga's name appears in the Stele of Ushumgal and the Gem of King Aga, both showing influence over Umma.

Reign
According to the Sumerian King List (ETCSL 2.1.1), Kish had the hegemony of Sumer where he reigned 625 years, succeeding his father Enmebaragesi to the throne, finally ending in defeat by Uruk.

The use of the royal title King of Kish expressing a claim of national rulership owes its prestige to the fact that Kish once did rule the entire nation. His reign probably covered Umma, and consequently Zabala, which was a dependent of it in the Early Dynastic Period; this can be supported on his appearance in the Gem of King Aga, where he is mentioned as the king of Umma. There is some scant evidence to suggest that like the later Ur III kings, the rulers of ED Kish sought to ingratiate themselves to the authorities in Nippur, possibly to legitimize a claim for leadership over the land of Sumer or at least part of it. Archeological evidence from Kish shows a city flourishing in ED II with its political influence extending beyond the territory, however in ED III the city declined rapidly.

Gilgamesh and Aga

In the poem Gilgamesh and Aga (ETCSL 1.8.1.1), Aga of Kish sends messengers to his vassal Gilgamesh in Uruk with a demand to work on the irrigation of Kish as slaves. Gilgamesh repeats the message before the "city fathers" (ab-ba-iri) to suggest rebelling against Aga, however, his proposition is rejected. Gilgamesh, not satisfied with the answer given, proposes the same to the guruš (lit. the able-bodied man) who would have to work themselves as slaves. They refer to Aga as the "son of the king"; suggesting that he is still young and immature. The guruš accept Gilgamesh's call to revolt and declare him lugal (king).

After ten days Aga lays siege to the walls of Uruk, whose citizens are now confused and intimidated. Gilgamesh asks for a volunteer to stand before Aga; his royal guard Birhurtura offers himself. On leaving the city gates, he is captured and brought before Aga himself, who interrogates and tortures him. However it did not last until a soldier leaned against the wall; in bewilderment, Aga asks the soldier if that is his king. Birhurtura denies this, replying that when their true king appears Aga's army will be beaten to dust and himself captured; this angers Aga, who continues to torture him.

Then Gilgamesh leans to the wall; his divine radiance does not frighten Aga but is beheld by the Kishite army. Enkidu and the guruš take advantage of the confusion of the enemies and advance through them; Aga is captured in the middle of his army. Gilgamesh addresses Aga as his superior, remembering how Aga saved his life and gave him refuge; Aga withdraws his demand and begs his favor to be returned. Gilgamesh, before Utu, sets Aga free to return to Kish.

Replacement in the poem
The Shulgi Hymn O (ETCSL 2.1.1) of the Ur III ruler Shulgi (c. 2094 BC – 2047 BC) praises Gilgamesh for defeating Enmebaragesi of Kish instead of his son. While in the historical scene of the Early Dynastic period this is quite conceivable, the assumption of two different wars is difficult to uphold because Gilgamesh emerges as victorious in both; his first victory would imply defeat and submission by the kingdom of Kish.

Since Gilgamesh addresses Aga denoting military relations between them in the past and indebtedness to him for saving his life, which leads to Gilgamesh being dependent on Aga previously, this conflicts with the assumption that he won a previous war against Kish.

Another theory is that since Enmebaragesi established the hegemony of Kish, defeating Aga would be less impressive than his powerful father, who therefore served the purpose of the hymn and portrays Gilgamesh as a mighty figure. Since Enmebaragesi was inserted to replace Aga, the hymn does not reflect a separate but rather one literary tradition from the tale.

See also
History of Sumer
Epic of Gilgamesh
Sumerian literature
Agag

Notes
a.

b.

c.

d.

Citations

References

External links
ETCSL - Text and translation of Gilgamesh and Aga (alternate site)

29th-century BC Sumerian kings
28th-century BC Sumerian kings
27th-century BC Sumerian kings
Kings of Kish
Sumerian kings
Characters in the Epic of Gilgamesh
Epic of Gilgamesh